The 1976 Formula One season was the 30th season of FIA Formula One motor racing. It featured the 1976 World Championship of Drivers  and the 1976 International Cup for Formula 1 Manufacturers . The two titles were contested over a sixteen race series which commenced on 25 January and ended on 24 October. Two non-championship races were also held during the 1976 season.

In an extraordinarily political and dramatic season, the World Championship went to McLaren driver James Hunt by one point from Ferrari's defending champion Niki Lauda, although Ferrari took the International Cup for Formula 1 Manufacturers. Hunt had moved from the Hesketh team to McLaren, taking the place of dual World Champion Emerson Fittipaldi who had moved to drive for his brother Wilson's Fittipaldi Automotive team for the season.

The controversy began in Spain where Hunt was initially disqualified from first place, giving the race to Lauda, only for the decision to be overturned on appeal months later. The six-wheeled Tyrrell P34 confounded the skeptics by winning in Sweden, with Lauda third and Hunt fifth.

Hunt won in France and, it seemed, in Britain, but the race had been restarted after a first lap pile-up and Hunt drove on an access road returning to the pits, which was against the rules. He was eventually disqualified after an appeal from Ferrari. Lauda became the official race winner.

Lauda had a massive crash in West Germany and appeared likely to die from his injuries. Hunt won the race and finished fourth to John Watson's Penske (the team's only win) in Austria. After missing two races, Lauda returned to finish fourth in Italy, where Hunt, Jochen Mass, and Watson were relegated to the back of the grid for infringements of the regulations.

Hunt won in Canada and in the US but Lauda took third to lead Hunt by three points going into the final race in Japan. In appalling weather conditions Mario Andretti won, Lauda withdrew because of the hazardous conditions, and Hunt eventually finished third to take the title.

Chris Amon drove his last Grand Prix in Germany, failing to win a single championship race. The 1976 Wolf–Williams cars were originally Heskeths, and Williams had left the team by September. After the departure of Matra at the end of the  season no French constructor competed in Formula One for three seasons until the Ligier's arrival at the start of this season. American-licensed constructor Shadow received a British licence, thus becoming the first constructor to officially change its nationality.

The 2013 film Rush is based on this season, focusing on the rivalry and friendship between James Hunt and Niki Lauda.

Teams and drivers
The following teams and drivers contested the 1976 World Championship of Drivers and the 1976 International Cup for Formula 1 Manufacturers.

Calendar
The Drivers and Manufacturers titles were contested over sixteen races.

Calendar changes 
The Argentine Grand Prix at Buenos Aires was originally scheduled as the first round of the season on 11 January, but was cancelled due to economic and political reasons; largely due to the installation of a military junta there.

The United States Grand Prix West hosted its first Grand Prix in 1976. The race was held on a street circuit in Long Beach near Los Angeles on 28 March.

The Spanish Grand Prix was moved permanently to Jarama near Madrid for 1976 from Montjuïc in Barcelona, This was done after five spectators were killed in the 1975 race plus the bad organisation of the race.

The Belgian Grand Prix and Monaco Grand Prix swapped places on the calendar so that the Monaco round follows the Belgian Grand Prix.

The Belgian Grand Prix was originally to be held at Nivelles-Baulers in Brussels was due to host the race in rotation with Circuit Zolder but the track surface at Nivelles had deteriorated and Zolder would host the race in 1976 on its intended date.

The British Grand Prix was moved from Silverstone to Brands Hatch, in keeping with the event-sharing arrangement between the two circuits.

The Dutch Grand Prix was moved from mid June to late August.

The Canadian Grand Prix returned to the calendar in 1976, it was cancelled in 1975 due to a dispute between two rival breweries, Labatt and Molson in sponsoring the race.

The Japanese Grand Prix hosted its first Grand Prix in 1976 with a three-year contract. The race was held at Fuji Speedway on 24 October.

Season report

Race 1: Brazil
For the opening round of the season in Brazil at the 5-mile Interlagos circuit in São Paulo, James Hunt took pole position in his McLaren with reigning World Champion Niki Lauda alongside in his Ferrari (which set the tone for the season). Clay Regazzoni in the second Ferrari took the lead at the start. Regazzoni, Lauda, Hunt and Shadow's Jean-Pierre Jarier battled. Regazzoni and Jarier collided, and the former had to pit for repairs. Lauda now led from Hunt and Jarier, but Hunt crashed out due to a sticking throttle, and Jarier did the same a lap later after driving on some oil in the track. Lauda thus started his title defence with victory, with Patrick Depailler second in the Tyrrell, and Tom Pryce completing the podium in the other Shadow.

Race 2: South Africa
At the Kyalami circuit near Johannesburg, Hunt took pole position for the second time in two races, with Lauda alongside again. It was Lauda who led into the first corner, with Hunt dropping down to fourth behind McLaren teammate Jochen Mass and Vittorio Brambilla in his March. Hunt was waved through by Mass, and passed Brambilla to take second after five laps. Lauda led from start to finish to win again, with Hunt second and Mass third for McLaren.

Race 3: United States GP West
Well after the South African race, the drivers assembled at Long Beach in the US for the third round. Regazzoni took pole position with Depailler second, forcing Hunt and Lauda onto the second row. The top four maintained their positions at the start, and almost immediately Regazzoni began to pull away. Hunt now tried to pass Depailler for second; they collided; Hunt was out, Depailler went wide, and Lauda sailed through to second. Depailler kept third until a spin which dropped him well down the order, but he charged back up to fifth, and was back in third after Pryce's Shadow, and Jody Scheckter in the second Tyrrell retired after driveshaft and suspension failures respectively. Regazzoni went on to take a dominant victory, with Lauda completing the Ferrari 1–2, and Depailler third.

Race 4: Spain
As the European season began at the Jarama circuit near Madrid, there was a big talking point as the Tyrrell team entered a new P34 six-wheeler for Depailler. Depailler was on the pace and qualified third, behind Hunt and Lauda. Lauda once again beat Hunt off the line at the start and led for the first third of the race. Depailler, after a slow start, was running fourth behind Mass when he spun off and crashed with brake problems. Just before mid-race, the McLarens of Hunt and Mass found another gear and drove past Lauda, but towards the end of the race, Mass had to retire with an engine failure. Hunt took his first win of the season, with Lauda second and Gunnar Nilsson's Lotus third.

After the race, Hunt was disqualified because his McLaren was found to be too wide. McLaren appealed, saying this was due to the expansion of the tyres during the race, and two months after the race, Hunt was reinstated.

Race 5: Belgium
The fifth round was at the Zolder circuit near the Dutch-Belgian border. Ferrari locked out the front row, with Lauda on pole from Regazzoni. Lauda motored away as the start, with Hunt up to second but, soon Regazzoni took the place back. The Ferraris raced away, and Hunt dropped to sixth, behind Jacques Laffite's Ligier and the two six-wheeled Tyrrells, before eventually retiring with a transmission failure. Depailler also retired when his engine blew up. Lauda won, and Regazzoni completed a dominant Ferrari 1–2, with Laffite taking his first podium.

Race 6: Monaco
Lauda took pole with Regazzoni alongside on the front row again. Lauda led into the first corner, and was never headed again. Ronnie Peterson's March got up to second, and allowed Lauda to pull away by holding up Regazzoni and the two Tyrrells. At one-third distance, Regazzoni went down an escape road because of oil on the track, and Peterson spun off and crashed on the next lap due to the same reason. This left Scheckter second and Depailler third but Regazzoni charged back and passed Depailler. He, however crashed out with 5 laps left while chasing Scheckter, thus ensuring that both the six-wheeled cars were on the podium behind Lauda.

Lauda now had a massive 33-point lead in the championship over Regazzoni and Hunt.

Race 7: Sweden
Scheckter took pole in Sweden at Anderstorp, the first for the Tyrrell P34, with Mario Andretti's Lotus second and Chris Amon an amazing 3rd on the grid in the Ensign. Andretti took the lead at the start, but went off with engine failure at around two thirds distance. The six-wheelers went on to dominate (much to the chagrin of some of the other teams) and finished 1–2, with Scheckter winning. Amon was robbed of a possible podium by a suspension failure. As a result, third place went to the consistent Lauda. With Hunt finishing fifth Scheckter was now second in the points for the world championship.

Race 8: France
The French round took place at the Paul Ricard circuit in the south of France, and 'normal service' was resumed, with Hunt on pole and Lauda second, with Depailler third, continuing Tyrrell's strong form. Lauda beat Hunt off the line as usual, and led the early stages until his engine failed. Hunt now led with Regazzoni close behind, but Regazzoni's Ferrari engine also failed. With the Ferraris out, any challenge to Hunt evaporated, and Hunt went on to win with Depailler second. Scheckter ran third until he faded away with engine trouble, giving John Watson third and Penske its first podium.

Race 9: Great Britain
The British fans had found a new hero in Hunt, but it was Lauda who took pole at Brands Hatch, beating the home hero Hunt into second, and Andretti showing Lotus's pace with third. At the start, Regazzoni began like a rocket and was immediately up to second, and was challenging Lauda. The two touched, and Regazzoni spun. He was hit by Hunt and Jacques Laffite but the rest of the field were away safely. However, there was too much debris on track, and the race was to be restarted. In controversial circumstances McLaren, Ferrari and Ligier had Hunt, Regazzoni and Laffite all take part in the restarted race in spare cars.

There was no trouble in the restart, as Lauda led from Hunt and Regazzoni into the first corner. The top three were unchanged till mid-race until Regazzoni retired with a gearbox problem, promoting Scheckter to third. Lauda led comfortably until he too suffered from gearbox troubles, and home hero Hunt took the lead with 15 minutes left, sending the home fans wild. Hunt went on to win, with Lauda hanging on to second and Scheckter third.

After the race, Ferrari, Tyrrell and the Fittipaldi team appealed against Hunt being allowed to take part in the spare car. Ferrari took the matter to the FIA (which was hypocritical since their own driver, Regazzoni had started in a spare, although he retired), and two months later, Hunt was disqualified and Lauda was given the win. Scheckter was promoted to second,  Watson had another podium, and Two-time champion Emerson Fittipaldi got sixth place and a point.

Race 10: West Germany
There were concerns by the drivers in the German GP held at the legendary Nordschleife about the safety of the track. The mountainous Nordschleife section of the Nürburgring was 14 miles (23 km) long – almost 3 times longer than Interlagos, the next longest circuit on the calendar and 7 times longer than the Monaco street circuit and its size meant it was nearly impossible to manage it safely to 1976 regulatory standards- the organizers were not willing or able to provide up to 5 times the marshals, medical services and firefighters needed at this circuit than at any other F1 circuit. Ultimately, all the drivers decided to race, and it was no surprise that Hunt and Lauda were on the front row, the British driver on pole, with Depailler heading the second row. At the start, on a damp but drying track, once again it was Regazzoni who started off best, whereas Lauda was slow and lost a lot of places. Regazzoni was leading from Hunt but he spun and dropped to fourth. At the end of the first lap, over eight minutes after the race started most of the drivers decided to pit for dry tyres. This left Mass's McLaren leading from Gunnar Nilsson.

On the second lap, Lauda lost control at high speed due to a suspected rear suspension failure and crashed into the barriers before bouncing back on to the track, and the car caught fire. The car was then hit by Harald Ertl's Hesketh and Brett Lunger's Surtees. The two drivers immediately got out of their cars, and soon Arturo Merzario stopped his Wolf–Williams as well and also Guy Edwards helped. The three pulled Lauda out of the burning car, and the race was stopped. It took the one helicopter (which was parked at the pits on one extreme end of the circuit) at the track an excruciating 5 to 6 minutes to get to the accident site, and Lauda was sent to hospital with serious burns and was fighting for his life.

The race restarted, with the starting slots of Lauda, Ertl and Lunger left empty. Hunt led at the restarted race with Regazzoni up to second, but this did not last long as Regazzoni spun off and dropped back, and Depailler hit the barriers while trying to avoid him. This left Hunt with a big lead ahead of Carlos Pace in the Brabham, the Brabham team showing some speed. Soon, Scheckter was up to second, and Pace was passed by a recovering Regazzoni. Hunt eased to victory ahead of Scheckter, and Mass completed the podium by passing Pace after Regazzoni spun off (again).

With Hunt's crucial victory at this longest of racing circuits, and after 49 years of Grand Prix racing, the 1976 German Grand Prix was the last Grand Prix at the old Nürburgring- one of the most iconic, historic and legendary circuits in Europe. The German Grand Prix moved further south to the Hockenheimring and Grand Prix racing did not return to the Nürburgring until 1984 on the newly constructed 2.8 mile Grand Prix circuit.

Race 11: Austria
The news before the Austrian GP at the Österreichring was that Lauda's condition was no longer life-threatening, but there was a low attendance with Lauda not racing; and Ferrari were so shaken by Lauda's crash that they did not compete at all. Hunt meanwhile took pole, ahead of countryman Watson and Ronnie Peterson. Watson took the lead at the start ahead of Peterson and Hunt, but soon Peterson was in the lead. Scheckter was on a charge from the mid-field, and he took the lead on the 10th lap, but then Watson was back in front. Scheckter battled until he crashed due to a suspension failure, and Peterson ultimately began to drop back. Watson thus won, the result being his and Penske's first win, and the podium was completed by Laffite and Nilsson.

Race 12: Netherlands
Lauda had begun his recovery, and was planning to race later in the season, and as a result, Ferrari were back in business in the Netherlands, but with only one car for Regazzoni. It was Peterson who took pole at Zandvoort, beating pole king Hunt and Tom Pryce's Shadow. Peterson led the early stages ahead of Watson, until Watson made a mistake which let Hunt through. Peterson then struggled and dropped behind Hunt, Watson and Regazzoni. Watson retired with a gearbox failure, promoting Regazzoni and Peterson, but the latter also retired when he lost oil pressure. Regazzoni now closed up on Hunt, bringing Mario Andretti with him, but Hunt held them off, with Regazzoni and Andretti within two seconds of him in second and third.

Race 13: Italy
After the Dutch GP, with Hunt only two points behind Lauda, the championship seemed to be a cakewalk for him. But then came the news that Lauda was going to make an astonishing return for the last four races of the season (it was so unexpected that Ferrari had to run three cars for Lauda, Regazzoni, and Lauda's supposed replacement Carlos Reutemann), just six weeks after his accident.

As the event went on at the modified Monza circuit, Laffite took pole in qualifying, with Scheckter's six-wheeler alongside and Pace third. Lauda was fifth, and Hunt along with Watson and Mass were penalised and sent to the back because of supposed fuel irregularities. At the start, Scheckter led ahead of Laffite and Depailler with Lauda down in the midfield, but soon Peterson was on a charge and took the lead after 14 laps. Peterson's charge also brought Regazzoni with him, and soon the Swiss was up to third. Scheckter dropped off, and the top four of Peterson, Depailler, Regazzoni and Laffite ran closely. Hunt spun off while trying to charge up the field, and Depailler dropped back late on with engine trouble. Peterson took his first win in two years, with Regazzoni second, Laffite third, and Lauda an incredible fourth.

Race 14: Canada
The week-long North American tour started with the teams assembling at the scenic Mosport Park track near Toronto for the Canadian Grand Prix. Hunt's disqualification from the British GP came after the Italian race, and as a result Hunt had only 47 points to Lauda's 64 with three races left. The Englishman took pole, with Peterson also on the front row ahead of March teammate Vittorio Brambilla. As usual, Hunt did not start well, and Peterson took the lead. But it was not for long as Hunt retook the lead on lap 10, and soon both Marches dropped way back, and so Depailler was second and Andretti third. The top three of Hunt, Depailler and Andretti were unchanged for the rest of the race. Lauda was running fifth until handling issues dropped him out of the points, and Hunt had closed the gap to 8 points.

Race 15: United States
The penultimate round and the second leg of the North American tour was in the US at Watkins Glen, New York, a circuit similar (and close by) to Mosport Park in that it was fast and scenic with a number of long, sweeping corners. Hunt took his eighth pole of the season, with the six-wheeler of Scheckter alongside, and Peterson third. As expected, Scheckter took the lead at the start, with Hunt and Brambilla following. The front two pulled away and battled, with Hunt passing Scheckter mid-race and Scheckter returning the favour a few laps later. Hunt took the lead again with 14 laps left and went on to win, and Scheckter had to settle for second. The Marches were again unable to keep up the pace, and it was left to Lauda to take an astonishing podium, just beating Mass in the second McLaren.

Race 16: Japan
The championship was to be decided in Japan at the fast Fuji Speedway near Tokyo, and Lauda was leading Hunt by three points. In qualifying, Hunt took second, but Lauda was right behind in third as Andretti took pole for Lotus. On race day, it rained heavily, and the weather was dreadful with the track full of water and the rain pelting down. Hunt got a good start for once, and took the lead from Andretti. Some of the drivers protested, saying it was too dangerous to race. At the end of the second lap, Lauda came into the pits and withdrew, saying that the conditions were too dangerous. Emerson Fittipaldi and Carlos Pace also withdrew. At the front, Hunt was leading but was soon challenged by Brambilla until the Italian spun out of contention. By mid-race, Mass had jumped up to second behind his teammate and acted as a protective buffer, but then crashed out. Hunt led from Depailler and Andretti, but then began to suffer from tyre wear, and both drivers passed with 11 laps left. This was still fine as Hunt was third and needed only three points to become World Champion, because he had more wins than Lauda. This became second when Depailler's tyres gave out, and he suffered a puncture but soon Hunt himself also had the same fate and had to pit. Andretti now led, with Alan Jones's Surtees second, Regazzoni third, Depailler fourth and Hunt fifth. On old, worn-out tyres, Jones and Regazzoni were fighting just to save their tyres, and first Depailler, and then Hunt with just two laps left passed both of them. Andretti won, getting his first win in five years, with Depailler second, and Hunt's third place meant that he was the F1 World Champion of 1976.

Results and standings

Grands Prix 
The 1976 World Championship of Drivers and the International Cup for Formula 1 Manufacturers were contested concurrently over a sixteen race series.

World Drivers' Championship standings 

Points were awarded on a 9–6–4–3–2–1 basis to the top six finishers in each race. The best seven results from the first eight races and the best seven results from the remaining eight races could be retained.

International Cup for F1 Manufacturers standings
 

Points were awarded on a 9–6–4–3–2–1 basis to the top six finishers in each race, but only to the first car to finish for each manufacturer. The best seven results from the first eight races and the best seven results from the remaining eight races were retained.

 Bold results counted to championship.

Non-championship races
Two non-championship races for Formula One cars were also held in 1976.

See also
 Hunt–Lauda rivalry

Notes and references

Formula One seasons